Hausa animism , "Maguzanci" or Bori is a pre-Islamic traditional religion of the Hausa people of West Africa that involves magic and  spirit possession. Most of the adherents of the religion accepted  Islam after the 18th century Jihad by the Islamic reformer  Usman dan Fodio.

Terminology
Bòòríí is a Hausa noun, meaning the spiritual force that resides in physical things, and is related to the word for local distilled alcohol (borassa) as well the practice of medicine (boka). The Bori religion is both an institution to control these forces, and the performance of an "adorcism" (as opposed to exorcism) ritual, dance and music by which these spirits are controlled and by which illness is healed.

Pre-Islamic Hausaland
An aspect of the traditional Maguzawa Hausa people's religious traditions, Bori became a state religion led by ruling-class priestesses among some of the late precolonial Hausa Kingdoms. When Islam started making inroads into Hausa land in the 14th century, certain aspects of the religion such as idol worship were driven underground. The cult of Tsumbubura in the then-Sultanate of Kano and many other similar Bori cults were suppressed, but Bori survived in "spirit-possession" cults by integrating some aspects of Islam. 
The Bori spirit possession priestesses maintained nominal influence over the Sultanates that replaced the earlier Animist kingdoms. Priestesses communed with spirits through ecstatic dance ritual, hoping to guide and maintain the state's ruling houses. A corps of Bori priestesses and their helpers was led by royal priestess, titled the Inna, or "Mother of us all".  The Inna oversaw this network, which was not only responsible for protecting society from malevolent forces through possession dances, but which provided healing  and divination throughout the kingdom.

Post-Islamic and contemporary practice
Muslim scholars of the early 19th century disapproved of the hybrid religion practised in royal courts, overzealous Muslims were to use this hybridization as an excuse to overthrow the Sultanates and form the Sokoto Caliphate.  With the birth of the Caliphate, Bori practices were partially suppressed in Fula courts.  Bori possession rituals survived in the Hausa refugee states  such as Konni and Dogondutchi (in what is today southern Niger) and in some rural areas of Nigerian Hausaland.  The powerful advisory roles of women, exemplified in the Bori priestesses, either disappeared or were transferred to Muslim women in scholarly, educational, and community leadership roles. British and French colonialism, though, offered little space for women in the official hierarchies of indirect rule, and the formal roles, like the Bori, for women in governance largely disappeared by the mid 20th century.

In modern Muslim Hausaland, Bori ritual survives in some places assimilated into syncretic practices. The ranks of the pre-Muslim "babbaku" spirits of the Maguzaci have been augmented  over time with "Muslim" spirits ("farfaru"), and spirits of (or representing) other ethnic groups, even those of the European colonialists. The healing and "luck" aspects of the performances of Bori members (almost exclusively women) provide new social roles for their rituals and practitioners.  Bori ritual societies, separated from governing structures, provide a powerful corporate identity for the women who belong to them through the practice of traditional healing, as well as through the performance of Bori festival like the girka initiation ritual.

References

Further reading
Adeline Masquelier. Prayer has Spoiled Everything: Possession, Power, and Identity in an Islamic Town of Niger. Duke University Press (2001). .
Adeline Masquelier (review): Girkaa: Une ceremonie d'initiation au culte de possession boorii des Hausa de la region de Maradi by Veit Erlmann, Habou Magagi. Journal of Religion in Africa, Vol. 22, Fasc. 3 (August 1992), pp. 277–279.
Adeline Masquelier. "Lightning, Death and the Avenging Spirits: 'Bori' Values in a Muslim World". Journal of Religion in Africa, Vol. 24, Fasc. 1 (February 1994), pp. 2–51.
Kari Bergstrom "Legacies of Colonialism and Islam for Hausa Women: An Historical Analysis, 1804-1960". Michigan State University Graduate Student Papers in Women and International Development Working Paper #276 (2002).
Jacqueline Cogdell Djedje. "Song Type and Performance Style in Hausa and Dagomba Possession (Bori) Music". The Black Perspective in Music, Vol. 12, No. 2 (Autumn 1984), pp. 166–182.
I. M. Lewis, S. al-Safi Hurreiz (eds). Women's Medicine, the Zar-Bori Cult in Africa and Beyond. Edinburgh University Press (1991). . 
Fremont E. Besmer. "Initiation into the 'Bori' Cult: A Case Study in Ningi Town". Africa: Journal of the International African Institute, Vol. 47, No. 1 (1977), pp. 1–13.
Frank Salamone. "Religion as Play: Bori, a Friendly 'Witchdoctor'". Journal of Religion in Africa, Vol. 7, Fasc. 3 (1975), pp. 201–211.
Umar Habila Dadem Danfulani."Factors Contributing to the Survival of the Bori Cult in Northern Nigeria". Numen, Vol. 46, No. 4 (1999), pp. 412–447.
A. J. N. Tremearne. The Ban of the Bori: Demons and Demon-Dancing in West and North Africa. London: Heath Cranton (1919).
A. J. N. Tremearne. "Bori Beliefs and Ceremonies". The Journal of the Royal Anthropological Institute of Great Britain and Ireland, Vol. 45, January - June 1915 (January - June 1915), pp. 23–68.
Ross S. Kraemer. "The Conversion of Women to Ascetic Forms of Christianity". Signs, Vol. 6, No. 2, Studies in Change (Winter 1980), pp. 298–307
I. M. Lewis. "Spirit Possession and Deprivation Cults". Man, New Series, Vol. 1, No. 3 (September 1966), pp. 307–329.

Traditional African religions
Animism in Africa
Hausa
Islamic extremism in Northern Nigeria
Religion in Niger
Religion in Nigeria
Spirit possession